Political Theory is a bimonthly peer-reviewed academic journal covering political science. Lawrie Balfour (University of Virginia) has been the editor-in-chief since 2016. From 2005 to 2012 the journal's editor-in-chief was Mary G. Dietz (Northwestern University); she was succeeded by Jane Bennett (Johns Hopkins University). Joshua Foa Dienstag (University of California, Los Angeles), Elisabeth Ellis (University of Otago, and Davide Panagia (University of California, Los Angeles) became editors in 2021. The journal was established in 1973 and is published by SAGE Publications.

Abstracting and indexing
The journal is abstracted and indexed in Scopus and the Social Sciences Citation Index. According to the Journal Citation Reports, the journal has a 2019 impact factor of 1.088.

References

External links

SAGE Publishing academic journals
English-language journals
Publications established in 1973
Political philosophy journals
Bimonthly journals